Graham Alan Cray (born 21 April 1947) is a retired British Anglican bishop. He was the Bishop of Maidstone in the Diocese of Canterbury from 2001 to 2009, and was the Archbishops' Missioner and Team Leader of Fresh Expressions from 2009 to 2014.

Early life and education
Cray grew up without his mother Doris, who killed herself when he was 8 years old. Cray was educated (gaining a Bachelor of Arts), at Leeds University and St John's College, Nottingham.

Ordained ministry
He began his ministry as a curate at St Mark's Church, Gillingham. Cray later spent 14 years at St Michael-le-Belfry in York (at first working with, and later succeeding, David Watson before becoming Principal of Ridley Hall theological college in Cambridge.

Cray was consecrated a bishop in March 2001. He served as the Bishop of Maidstone, a suffragan bishop in the Diocese of Canterbury, between 2001 and 2009. In 2009, he was appointed to lead the Archbishops' (of Canterbury and of York) Fresh Expressions team. He retired from full-time ministry in 2014.

He is the Chairman of Soul Survivor.

References

1947 births
Alumni of the University of Leeds
Living people
Bishops of Maidstone
Staff of Ridley Hall, Cambridge